The Bank Al-Maghrib is the central bank of the Kingdom of Morocco. It was founded in 1959 as the successor to the State Bank of Morocco (est. 1907). In 2008 Bank Al-Maghrib held reserves of foreign currency with an estimated worth of US$36 billion. In addition to currency management, the Bank Al-Maghrib also supervises a number of private banks supplying commercial banking services. The bank is headquartered on Avenue Mohammed V in Rabat; it has a branch in Casablanca and agencies in 18 other cities in Morocco.

History 

In 1958, the Moroccan government commenced negotiations with France and the State Bank of Morocco to reclaim for itself the right to issue money. Decree n° 1.59.233 of 30 June 1959 created the Banque du Maroc, which took over the issuance of money the next day, and replaced the State Bank of Morocco. In October, the Banque du Maroc issued a new currency, the dirham.

The Banking Act of 21 April 1967 enhanced the role of "Banque du Maroc", particularly in the field of banking supervision.

In 1974, the Banque du Maroc commenced issuing the centime as a fraction of the dirham, replacing the franc.

In March 1987, the bank adopted the name Bank Al-Maghrib. That same month, the bank established Dar As-Sikkah, the unit that would be responsible for printing bank notes and minting coins.

A new banking act in July 1993 created a unified regulatory framework for all credit institutions. This act strengthened the Bank Al-Maghrib in its role of regulating and supervising credit institutions in Morocco. October saw the passage of amendments to the Bank's statutes that clarified its role in monetary policy, and that granted it greater autonomy.

In 2006, Law No.76-03, promulgated by Dahir No. 1-05-38 of 20th Chaoual 1426 (23 November 2005) repealed Dahir No. 1-59-233 of 23rd Hija 1378 (30 June 1959), which had created Bank Al-Maghrib. The new law reinforced Bank Al-Maghrib's independence in terms of monetary policy, and provided a legal basis for its responsibility for the payment system. The new law established the bank as a public legal entity, controlled by the account commissioner, the government commissioner, and the Court of Account. Law No.34-03 expanded the jurisdiction of the banking law over certain institutions engaged in banking activities, redefined the roles of the National Council of Credit and the Committee of Credit Establishments, reinforced Bank Al-Maghrib's autonomy in banking supervision, and instituted a number of other measures covering the protection of clients of credit institutions and the treatment of credit institutions in distress.

On 15 November 2022, Bank Al-Maghrib and the Office des Changes (OE), the country's foreign trade watchdog, signed a partnership agreement on Monday in Rabat. The agreement aims to establish a formal framework for the exchange of data and know-how in areas of common interest.

The bank is a member of the Alliance for Financial Inclusion and active in promoting financial inclusion policy.

Governors 

M'Hamed Zeghari, 1959–1964
Driss Slaoui, 1964–1967
M'Hamed Zeghari, 1967–1969
Prince Moulay Hassan Ben El Mehdi, 1969–1984
Ahmed Bennani, April 1985 – September 1989
Mohamed Seqat, 1989 – March 2003
Abdellatif Jouahri, March 2003 -

See also 

 Moroccan dirham
 Economy of Morocco
 List of central banks of Africa

References

External links 

  
 Currency Exchange Practices at Moroccan Banks

Economy of Morocco
Government-owned companies of Morocco
Banks of Morocco
Morocco
1959 establishments in Morocco
Banks established in 1959